The Ninth Mother of all Battles Championship, commonly referred to as the 1999 Iraqi Elite Cup, was the ninth occurrence of the Iraqi Elite Cup, organised by the Iraq Football Association. The top eight teams of the 1998–99 Iraqi Premier League competed in the tournament. In the final, held at Al-Shaab Stadium, Al-Zawraa defeated Al-Quwa Al-Jawiya 2–0.

Group stage

Group 1

Notes

Group 2

Semifinals

Third place match

Final

References

External links
 Iraqi Football Website

Football competitions in Iraq
1999–2000 in Iraqi football